Gloria was an Italian professional cycling team that existed in part between 1927 and 1943. Its main sponsor was Italian bicycle manufacturer Gloria. Francesco Camusso won the general classification of the 1931 Giro d'Italia with the team.

References

Defunct cycling teams based in Italy
1927 establishments in Italy
1942 disestablishments in Italy
Cycling teams established in 1927
Cycling teams disestablished in 1942